Papilio nobicea, the Volta swallowtail, is a butterfly in the family Papilionidae. It is found in Ghana and Togo. The habitat consists of forests in mountainous terrain.

Taxonomy
It is a member of the zenobia species group. In the zenobia group the basic upperside wing pattern is black with white or yellowish bands and spots. The underside is brown and basally there is a red area marked with black stripes and spots. In the discal area there is a yellowish band with black stripes and veins. Females resemble butterflies of the genus Amauris. Both sexes lack tails.

The clade members are:
Papilio cyproeofila Butler, 1868
Papilio fernandus Fruhstorfer, 1903
Papilio filaprae Suffert, 1904
Papilio gallienus Distant, 1879 
Papilio mechowi Dewitz, 1881
Papilio mechowianus Dewitz, 1885
Papilio nobicea Suffert, 1904 
Papilio zenobia Fabricius, 1775

Description
Papilio nobicea is very similar to Papilio zenobia but has pure white discal bands with no cream tinge. (Larsen, 2005). In the Global Butterfly Information System nobicea Suffert, 1904 is treated as a junior synonym of Papilio (Druryia) zenobia Fabricius, 1775.

See also

References

nobicea
Butterflies described in 1904